Guy François Coëtnempren de Kersaint (7 June 1703 in Plounéventer – 20 November 1759 in Battle of Quiberon Bay) was a French Navy officer. He served in the Seven Years' War.

Biography 
Kersaint joined the Navy as a Garde-Marine in February 1722, and was promoted to Ensign in October 1731, Lieutenant in May 1741, and Captain in January 1747.

In 1756, he took command of the 74-gun Intrépide. He led a division to cruise off Guinea, destroying British factories and engaging in commerce raiding. He then sailed to the Caribbean. On 21 October 1757, near Caicos, he encountered three British ships, leading to the Battle of Cap-Français. Kersaint was wounded and  Intrépide was almost completely dismasted, but she managed to repel the British.

In 1759, he took command of Thésée. He took part in the Battle of Quiberon Bay on 20 November 1759. During the battle, as Kersaint was attempted to come to the aid of Conflans, Thésée performed a turn without closing her lower gunports. Water rushed into the gundeck, and Thésée capsized, killing most aboard.

Sources and references 
 Notes

References

 Bibliography
 

External links
 

French Navy officers